Sangan (also Romanized as Sangān and Sengān; also known as Sankān and Singān) is a village in Bahu Kalat Rural District, Dashtiari District, Chabahar County, Sistan and Baluchestan Province, Iran. At the 2006 census, its population was 707, in 113 families.

References 

Populated places in Chabahar County